The 66th Infantry Brigade was an infantry brigade of the British Army that was originally raised, as the 66th Brigade, in 1914 during the First World War as part of Kitchener's New Armies and served with the 22nd Division. With the division, the brigade was sent to France in September 1915 to reinforce the British Army on the Western Front but was instead sent to Greece and served in the campaign in the Balkans for the rest of the war.

The brigade was reformed, as the 66th Infantry Brigade, in the Second World War in Italy on 20 July 1944. The brigade fought in the Italian Campaign with the 1st Infantry Division until 27 January 1945 when, with the rest of the 1st Division, it was shipped to Palestine and finally Syria where it ended the war.

Orders of battle

First World War
 9th (Service) Battalion, Border Regiment
 9th (Service) Battalion, South Lancashire Regiment
 8th (Service) Battalion, King's Shropshire Light Infantry
 13th (Service) Battalion, Manchester Regiment
 12th (Service) Battalion, Cheshire Regiment

Second World War
 2nd Battalion, Royal Scots
 11th Battalion, Lancashire Fusiliers
 1st Battalion, Hertfordshire Regiment

Second World War Commanders
 Brig. M. Redmayne

Infantry brigades of the British Army in World War I
Infantry brigades of the British Army in World War II